Kansas v. Marsh, 548 U.S. 163 (2006), is a United States Supreme Court case in which the Court held that a Kansas death penalty statute was consistent with the United States Constitution. The statute in question provided for a death sentence when the aggravating factors and mitigating factors were of equal weight.

Background 
Michael Lee Marsh II was convicted of murder. The Kansas capital punishment statute allowed for the imposition of the death penalty if the mitigating and aggravating factors were of equal weight, so Marsh was sentenced to death. 

After Marsh's sentencing, the Kansas Supreme Court in State v Kleypas, declared the law unconstitutional under the Eighth Amendment and overturned it. Ruling that "fundamental fairness requires that a 'tie goes to the defendant' when life or death is at issue".

Judgement 
By a 5–4 vote, the United States Supreme Court reversed the Kansas Supreme Court's decision and upheld the Kansas death penalty statute. Justice Souter as well as Justices Stevens, Ginsburg and Breyer dissented from the majority, with Justice Souter calling the Kansas death penalty statute "morally absurd", "a moral irrationality" and "obtuse by any moral or social measure".

Justice Scalia criticised the dissenting opinion, claiming that the dissenting justices failed to cite a case in which it is clear that an individual was executed for a crime they did not commit: Capital cases are given especially close scrutiny at every level, which is why in most cases many years elapse before the sentence is executed. And of course capital cases receive special attention in the application of executive clemency. Indeed, one of the arguments made by the abolitionists is that the process of finally completing all the appeals and reexaminations of capital sentences is so lengthy, and thus so expensive for the state, that the game is not worth the candle.

The proof of the pudding, of course, is that as far as anyone can determine (and many are looking), none of cases included in the .027% error rate for American verdicts involved a capital defendant erroneously executed.

Criticism 
Justice Scalia's concurrence has been criticised for describing a criminal justice system "unfamiliar to anyone who has ever covered a murder case, read a book about one, or watched television news".

See also 
 List of United States Supreme Court decisions on capital punishment

References

External links
 

United States Supreme Court cases
United States Supreme Court cases of the Roberts Court
Cruel and Unusual Punishment Clause and death penalty case law
Capital punishment in Kansas
2006 in United States case law